Manisaspor is a Turkish professional football club located in the city of Manisa. Originally formed in 1931 as Sakaryaspor, the club changed its name to Manisaspor on 15 June 1965. The club colours are red, white, and black. Manisaspor play their home matches at Manisa 19 Mayis Stadi.

History
Manisaspor was founded in 1931 as Sakaryaspor, although the club was not located in Sakarya. The original club colours were black and white. Sakaryaspor won the Manisa Amateur League 15 times, and finished 3rd in the Turkish Amateur League in 1954.

The club ceased operations during World War II, but continued competing in 1946. In 1964, Manisaspor were allowed to compete professionally in the 1.Lig as Manisa Sakaryaspor. In their first season, the club finished with 16 points, earning them relegation. However, on 15 June 1965 at 21:00, Sakaryaspor officially became Manisaspor, and the club was allowed to compete in the 1. Lig again.

Manisaspor spent the first forty years of their existence in the lower leagues of the Turkish football league system. In 2001, they received a financial boost from Zorlu Holding, who injected the club with money. In turn, Manisaspor were re-branded as Vestel Manisaspor. Their first promotion to the Süper Lig came in 2005 under the guidance of manager Levent Eriş.

Ersun Yanal was named new manager for the 2005–06 season. At the end of the winter break in the 2006–07 season, Manisaspor were flying high in fourth position. However, they could not keep up the results, finishing in 12th place, four points away from relegation.

Manisaspor finally relegated from First League after finishing it as 16th in 2014–15 season and returned to third level after 13 years.

Colours and badge

Manisaspor originally wore black and white kits. The club changed their badge, removing the Vestel moniker and replacing it with the club's foundation year (1965).

League participations

 Super League: 2005–2008, 2009–2012
 First League: 1964–1978, 1980–1983, 1991–1993, 1994–1995, 2002–2005, 2008–2009, 2012–2015, 2016–2018
 Second League: 1978–1980, 1984–1991, 1993–1994, 1995–2002, 2015–2016, 2018-
 Amateur Level: 1931–1964, 1983–1984

Manisali Tarzan

The club has a loyal following in the city. Their ultras are known as ‘Tarzanlar’, named after a local hero known as ‘Manisa Tarzanı’ (Tarzan of Manisa). He was a veteran of WW1 decorated with military honors who gave up his privileges, giving all his money to the poor, to commit his life to the reforestation of Manisa after most of the city's trees and green areas were burned down during the Greco-Turkish War (1919–1922).

Current squad

Managers
 Reha Kapsal (2001)
 Mustafa Denizli (2003–04)
 Ersun Yanal (Oct 2005 – May 7)
 Giray Bulak (March 2007 – Jan 08)
 Yilmaz Vural (Jan 2008 – March 8)
 Levent Eriş (March 2008 – June 9)
 Mesut Bakkal (2009–10)
 Reha Kapsal (2010)
 Hakan Kutlu (July 2010 – Sept 10)
 Hikmet Karaman (Sept 2010 – June 11)
 Kemal Özdeş (Aug 2011 – Jan 12)
 Ümit Özat (2012)
 Taner Taşkın(?-)

References

External links
Official website
Manisaspor on TFF.org
Manisaspor and Turkish football club info and news in English 

 
Association football clubs established in 1965
Sport in Manisa
Football clubs in Turkey
1965 establishments in Turkey
Süper Lig clubs